Preserje pri Zlatem Polju is a small settlement in the hills north of Lukovica pri Domžalah in the eastern part of the Upper Carniola region of Slovenia.

References

External links

Preserje pri Zlatem Polju on Geopedia

Populated places in the Municipality of Lukovica